The International Women's Flat Track Derby Association Championships ("WFTDA Championships" or "Champs" for short) are the leading competition for roller derby leagues.

The Championships are organised by the Women's Flat Track Derby Association (WFTDA).  They originated in 2006 as the National WFTDA Championship.  The "Dust Devil" tournament was contested in front of several thousand fans in Tucson, Arizona.  This was the first multi-league flat track roller derby tournament. In 2017, the final game of the tournament will be broadcast live on ESPN2.

In 2019, the Championships were hosted outside the United States for the first time, in Montreal, Canada.

Format

In 2007, Western and Eastern Region Tournaments were held in order to determine qualifiers for the "Texas Shootout" National Championship, held in Austin, Texas.  By 2010, with leagues in Canada and the United Kingdom also enjoying membership of the WFTDA, "National" was dropped from the title of the contest.

Through the 2012 WFTDA season, the WFTDA was divided into regions based on geography. Each region held a tournament contested by its top ten leagues: the Eastern (2007–2012), North Central (2009–2012), South Central (2009–2012) and Western (2007–2012) Regional Tournaments. The top three leagues from each of these four tournaments qualified for the Championships.  Together, the qualifying tournaments and Championships were termed the "Big 5".

From 2013 through 2016, full WFTDA members were eligible for ranking in one of the association's three divisions. Division 1 comprised the top 40-ranked teams in the WFTDA, and the top 40 teams that met eligibility requirements based on the June 30 rankings of that year were invited to Division 1 Playoffs, and were divided into four playoff tournaments (10 per tournament) using an S-curve for seeding. Participants in Division 1 Playoffs were not required to be current members of Division 1, as long as they meet ranking and other requirements. The teams that finished first through third at each Division 1 Tournament then moved on to the WFTDA Championship tournament. Division 2 comprised the teams ranked 41 through 100, and the next 20 teams overall that meet requirements after the 40 confirmed Division 1 playoff participants were then invited to Division 2 Playoffs, divided into two playoff tournaments. The top 2 teams of each Division 2 Tournament then played each other at the WFTDA Championship Tournament, with the winner crowned the Division 2 champion. Through 2014, Division 3 comprised all ranked teams from 101 on, and there are no Division 3 Playoffs.

Starting with the 2017 season, the top 36 teams compete in three Division 1 Playoff Tournaments, and the top four finishers from each tournament go on to the WFTDA Championship Tournament. The next 16 eligible teams compete in a single Division 2 Playoff Tournament, with the winner crowned the Division 2 champion.

Since 2008, the winner of the Championships has been awarded the Hydra Trophy.

Broadcast
The tournament is broadcast on the WFTDA online service WFTDA.tv on a pay-per-view basis; starting in 2015 the WFTDA entered into a partnership with ESPN whereby the Sunday games of the tournament – the Division 1 and Division 2 championship and 3rd place games – are carried on ESPN3. For 2017 the format was changed, with the Division 2 Championship occurring earlier in the year, and the Division 1 championship game scheduled to be broadcast on ESPN2, marking the first time contemporary women's flat track roller derby will be aired live on American network television.

Championships

2006 Dust Devil

In Tucson, Arizona, over the weekend of February 24–26, 2006, Tucson Roller Derby hosted 20 WFTDA leagues from around the United States in a tournament to determine the nation's first-ever WFTDA national champion team.

Round-robin bouts were instituted to determine seeding for a single-elimination tournament. Four pools were created, titled Scorpion, Tarantula, Black Widow and Rattlesnake, with each pool consisting of 5 teams. On Friday, February 24, 2006, each team played four ten-minute bouts in each pool. Point differential was used to determine the ranking and placement of each team within its pool. With this information in hand, tournament officials selected the top three teams of each pool and seeded them according to the point differential of each team for the single-elimination tournament.

The single-elimination tournament started on Saturday, February 25, 2006 with 12 of the previous day's 20 teams. Scheduling of the bouts allowed for the top four seeded teams to receive a bye in the first round of play. Teams seeded 5 through 12 played in the first round. The winners of the first round of the single elimination tournament played the top four seeds in the second round. Bout winners advanced to the semi-finals and bout losers were eliminated.

On Sunday February 26, 2006, four teams (Texas Rollergirls Texecutioners, Tucson Roller Derby Saddletramps, Minnesota Rollergirls All-Stars and Arizona Roller Derby Tent City Terrors) played in the semi-final bouts. In the first bout, the Texecutioners defeated the Tent City Terrors in a full three-period bout, 114 to 81, sending the Texas to the championship bout and Arizona to the 3rd-place bout. A second full three-period semi-final bout was played between Tucson and the Minnesota Rollergirls. Tucson defeated Minnesota 136–75. This pitted the Tent City Terrors against Minnesota for the 3rd-place bout, and set the WFTDA National Championship Bout to be between Texas and Tucson. The 3rd-place bout was played out with the Tent City Terrors upsetting 3rd-seeded Minnesota 115–88. The Championship bout was finalized later in the evening, with the Texecutioners defeating the Saddletramps 129–96.

The tournament also saw the first collaboration between roller derby announcers.  Following the event, announcer Bob Noxious founded "Voices of Reason", an announcers' association.

2007 Texas Shootout
On September 30, 2007, the Kansas City Roller Warriors beat the Rat City Rollergirls 89–85 in the final match of the Texas Shootout to become the 2007 national champion. The Texas Rollergirls placed third.  Eight teams competed in the tournament, four from the eastern regional division and four from the western regional division. These teams included Carolina Rollergirls (fourth place), Gotham Girls Roller Derby, Tucson Roller Derby, Detroit Derby Girls, and Windy City Rollers.

A statement from WFTDA President "Crackerjack" on page 5 of the program for this event suggests that at the time it was considered the "first WFTDA Championship Tournament."

2008 Northwest Knockdown
On November 16, 2008, the Gotham Girls Roller Derby (GGRD All-Stars) beat the Windy City Rollers 134–66 in the championship bout. The Philly Rollergirls (Liberty Belles) beat the Texas Rollergirls (Texecutioners) 114–95 in the consolation bout to take third place.

2009 Declaration of Derby
The Denver Roller Dolls pioneered the "slow derby" style of play, utilizing slow and stopped packs and backwards skating, which proved effective against most opposition, but unpopular with crowds.  They were finally defeated 178–91 in the semi-finals by the Oly Rollers were regarded as a largely unknown force, although they had gone undefeated through the whole season.  Rocky Mountain Rollergirls had unexpectedly sailed through their qualifying tournament, and beat Philly Rollergirls in an overtime jam in their quarter final, but they lost to defending champions Texas Rollergirls 139–82 in the semi-final, in a bout which saw Rocky skater DeRanged ejected from the tournament after apparently punching Angie-Christ from Texas.

Denver defeated Rocky 151–103 in the third place bout, greatly aided by forty-four points to nil scored in the later section of the first half.  Oly dominated Texas in the championship bout, taking the title 178–100.

2010 Uproar on the Lakeshore
The final was particularly hard-fought.  The Oly Rollers built up a half-time lead, 84 points to the Rocky Mountain Rollergirls' 49, principally due to Atomatrix's power jams.  Although she ultimately scored 101 points for Oly, Rocky Mountain were able to fight back in the second half.  With one jam remaining, Oly retained an eight-point lead, but, jamming for the third time in a row, Rocky Mountain's Frida Beater scored nine unopposed points before calling off the jam, to secure a win by a single point.

Quarter-finals:

Semi-finals:

Third place play-off:

Final:

2011 Continental Divide and Conquer
First round:

Quarter finals:

Semi finals:

Third place play-off:

Final:

2020
The 2020 International WFTDA Championships were canceled in May due to the COVID-19 pandemic, joining the previously-announced cancellation of the season's Playoffs and Continental Cups.

References

Recurring sporting events established in 2006
Roller derby competitions
Women's Flat Track Derby Association